Rinne Oost (born 7 September 1974) is a visually impaired Dutch Paralympic cyclist. He represented the Netherlands at the 2012 Summer Paralympics held in London, United Kingdom and he won one bronze medal.

Oost won the bronze medal in the men's 1 km time trial B event together with his pilot Patrick Bos.

References 

Living people
1974 births
Place of birth missing (living people)
Cyclists at the 2012 Summer Paralympics
Medalists at the 2012 Summer Paralympics
Paralympic bronze medalists for the Netherlands
Paralympic medalists in cycling
Dutch male cyclists
Paralympic cyclists with a vision impairment
Paralympic cyclists of the Netherlands
21st-century Dutch people
Dutch blind people